John Hatzistergos  (born 20 August 1960) is an Australian judge of the District Court of New South Wales. He is a former politician who was a member of the New South Wales Legislative Council representing the Labor Party between 1999 and 2011, and a minister in various Labor governments.

Early life and education
Born in Redfern, Sydney, the son of two Greek immigrants, Hatzistergos was educated at Bourke Street Primary School in Surry Hills and Cleveland Street Boys' High School.

Hatzistergos studied economics and law at the University of Sydney, where he was later appointed to the Senate of the University.

Career

Legal career
Hatzistergos was a solicitor in private practice between 1983 and 1987. He spent the next two years as a Senior Legal Officer with the Commonwealth Director of Public Prosecutions and a barrister in private practice since 1989.

Political career
Hatzistergos joined the East Redfern branch of the ALP in 1976, was secretary of the Campsie branch from 1983 to 1990 and later the Belmore branch from 1993 to 2000. First elected to the New South Wales Legislative Council in 1999 while was serving as Deputy Mayor of Canterbury City Council. Hatzistergos served as the NSW Minister for Health, between 2005–2007 and again briefly for 14 days in 2009, Minister for Fair Trading (2005) and Minister for Justice, between 2003–2005 and again between 2007–2009. Hatzistergos served as Attorney General from 2007 until 2011, and Minister for Industrial Relations between 2008 and 2009. He was Minister for Citizenship, Minister for Regulatory Reform, Vice President of the Executive Council and Government Leader in the Legislative Council.

He implemented major reforms to freedom of information and privacy through new legislation and the establishment of the Information and Privacy Commission. Other achievements include the establishment of the Australian International Disputes Centre in Sydney and Uniform Domestic Arbitration Laws, Intensive Correction Orders and Forum Sentencing. He also implemented major reforms to the NSW Children's Court following the Wood Special Commission of Inquiry.

During his tenure, Hatzistergos was a nationally recognised opponent of a Bill of Rights. In late 2010 it was reported that he was being considered a possible candidate for appointment to the Supreme Court of New South Wales, and a potential successor to Chief Justice Reg Blanch of the District Court of New South Wales.

On 31 March 2011, Hatzistergos announced that he intended to retire from the Legislative Council despite having four years of his term to run. His announcement followed that of Eddie Obeid with Walt Secord and Adam Searle nominated by Labor to fill the casual vacancies.

Post-political career
In late 2011 Hatzistergos became an adjunct professor at the University of Technology Sydney, teaching constitutional law. In July 2014 Hatzistergos was asked by the NSW Government to assist in the review the NSW Bail laws in response to controversy over a number of decisions made by magistrates. Hatzistergos recommended a number of changes to recalibrate the manner in which NSW courts would assess the risk posed by people charged with serious offenses. His recommendations were accepted by the NSW Government.
On 10 October 2014 NSW Attorney General Brad Hazzard announced Hatzistergos's appointment as a judge of the District Court of New South Wales.

References

 

Members of the New South Wales Legislative Council
Australian people of Greek descent
1960 births
Living people
Attorneys General of New South Wales
Sydney Law School alumni
Australian Labor Party members of the Parliament of New South Wales
21st-century Australian politicians
Members of the Order of Australia
Judges of the District Court of NSW
21st-century Australian judges